Cirsium rhothophilum is a rare North American species of thistle known by the common name surf thistle. It is endemic to California, where it is known only from the coastline around the border between San Luis Obispo and Santa Barbara Counties. It grows in sand dunes and coastal scrub near the beach.

The thick leaves are wavy and covered in feltlike hairs. They may have smooth, lobed, or toothed edges and small spines. The largest leaves at the base of the plant may reach  in length. The inflorescence bears several clustered flower heads, each head up to 4 centimeters long and 6 cm wide. The heads are lined with woolly phyllaries and filled with off-white to pale yellowish disc florets but no ray florets. The fruit is an achene a few millimeters long with a pappus up to 2 centimeters in length.

References

External links
photo of herbarium specimen at Missouri Botanical Garden, collected in Santa Barbara County, isotype of Carduus maritima/Cirsium rhothophilum
Jepson Manual Treatment
Calphotos Photo gallery, University of California

rhothophilum
Endemic flora of California
Plants described in 1905
Flora without expected TNC conservation status